Timepiece is another word for a clock.

Time Piece, film by Jim Henson

Music
Timepieces: The Best of Eric Clapton
Timepiece (album), Kenny Rogers
"Time Piece", song by Nick Drake from Family Tree (Nick Drake album) and Tuck Box
"Timepiece", by Blood Has Been Shed from I Dwell on Thoughts of You
"Time Piece", song by Bad Habits (Nav album)

Other
Timepiece (horse)